Steven Whitehurst (born 1967) is an African-American author, poet, and educator who currently resides in Calumet City, Illinois.

Biography 

Born Steven Fondren into a single-parent family on the South Side of Chicago, Illinois, he was raised by his mother Oneda Fondren, and grandmother Sarah Fondren. When he was young his mother married and her name became Oneda Whitehurst. Steven was adopted by the groom and his last name was also changed to Whitehurst. At this time he moved to, and subsequently grew up in, Harvey, Illinois.

After graduating from Thornton Township High School in 1984, Whitehurst attended Southern Illinois University at Carbondale where he was a U.S. Air Force ROTC student. He moved on to become a double degree high honors graduate of Thornton Community College—now South Suburban College—with degrees in history and geography. While there Whitehurst was inducted into the Phi Theta Kappa Honor Fraternity. He then graduated cum laude from Chicago State University with a B.A. in history and a minor in political science. Whitehurst later returned to Chicago State University to pursue additional educational credits in the history/ethnic studies graduate degree program.  His political activities included participating in civil rights marches for racial/social justice; working as a canvasser for numerous political campaigns including those of Senator Carol Moseley Braun, Judge R. Eugene Pincham, and the Jesse Jackson presidential campaign, 1988; and being appointed and briefly serving as the Illinois Solidarity Party's 2nd Congressional District State Central Committeeman and Thornton Township Committeeman.

After college he worked for the United States Equal Employment Opportunity Commission as an investigator. In 1991, Whitehurst returned to his alma mater -- South Suburban College—as the Academic Skills/Transition Advisor for the Student Support Services TRIO Grant Program. In 1994, he was promoted to an administrative post as the college's Director of Student Development, where he initiated, developed, and oversaw the school's first transfer articulation agreement with a historically Black college/university - Wilberforce University. In the position of Director of Student Development he managed seven departments, both in academic and student support areas—including the Student Support Services Grant Program for which he had previously worked. In 1996, he was forced to retire due to health issues.

Whitehurst is the author of the book Words From An Unchained Mind and contributed to Rodney King And The L.A. Rebellion: Analysis & Commentary By 13 Independent Black Writers. Whitehurst was also among those featured on the nationally televised program Heroes: A Triumph Of Spirit, Vol. 4, which highlighted positive individuals in the African-American community. His book and movie reviews have appeared in numerous publications. Steven has written pieces supporting Barack Obama's presidential campaigns, pieces calling for universal health care in America, and for the legalization of marijuana.

Books
 Words From An Unchained Mind (United Brothers & Sisters Communications Systems, 1991. )
 Rodney King And The L.A. Rebellion: Analysis & Commentary By 13 Independent Black Writers (United Brothers & Sisters Communications Systems, 1992. )

Awards
 New Scriblerus Society Creative Excellence Award
 Afrique Newsmagazine 1994 Malcolm X Award for Self-Actualization
 1995 Hero Award
 Listed in "Who's Who In America"
 Listed in "Who's Who Among African Americans"
 Listed in "Who's Who In Writers, Editors & Poets"

Reviews
 The FBI's War On Black America Documentary By Denis Mueller and Deb Ellis (MPI Home Video) - Reviewed in "The National Newport News & Commentator," July/August 1992.
 My Life With The Black Panther Party By Akua Njeri (Burning Spear Publications) - Reviewed in the "South Suburban Standard" Newspaper, January 9, 1992.
 Culture of Violence: The Foundation of White America On Slavery and Genocide By Penny Hess (Burning Spear Publications) - Reviewed in the "Multicultural Publishers Exchange," January/February 1993.
 The Last Speeches of Huey P. Newton Presentations By Omali Yeshitela (Burning Spear Publications) - Reviewed in the "Multicultural Publishers Exchange," January/February 1993.

References

External links
 Official Steven Whitehurst Website
 Official Steven Whitehurst Facebook
 Official Steven Whitehurst Tagged Profile
 The Whitehurst Blog

1967 births
Living people
African-American atheists
African-American poets
African-American non-fiction writers
People from Harvey, Illinois
Writers from Chicago
American political writers
Activists for African-American civil rights
People from Calumet City, Illinois
American atheists
American bloggers
American male poets
20th-century American poets
21st-century American poets
20th-century American male writers
21st-century American male writers
21st-century American non-fiction writers
American male non-fiction writers
American male bloggers
20th-century African-American writers
21st-century African-American writers
African-American male writers